Bow Lake is a  water body located in Strafford and Rockingham counties in eastern New Hampshire, United States, in the towns of Strafford and Northwood. Its outlet is the Isinglass River, flowing east to the Atlantic Ocean via the Cocheco and Piscataqua rivers.

The lake is classified as a cold- and warmwater fishery, with observed species including rainbow trout, brown trout, smallmouth bass, largemouth bass, chain pickerel, horned pout, and white perch.

Every year there are fireworks of Strafford and Northwood over Bow Lake, and it is a popular place to swim, boat and fish for those who live in the towns around it.

See also

List of lakes in New Hampshire

References

Lakes of Rockingham County, New Hampshire
Lakes of Strafford County, New Hampshire
Strafford, New Hampshire
Northwood, New Hampshire